Aechmea mutica is a plant species in the genus Aechmea. This species is endemic to the State of Espírito Santo in eastern Brazil.

References

mutica
Flora of Brazil
Plants described in 1955